This is a list of characters associated with the character The Punisher.

Family

Tree

|-
|style="text-align: left;"|Notes:

Frank Castle Jr.
Francis "Frank" Castle Jr. is the son of The Punisher (Frank Castle) in Marvel Comics. The character, created by Gerry Conway and Tony DeZuniga, first appeared in Marvel Preview  #2 (Aug. 1975).

Frank Jr. was Frank Castle Sr.'s son and youngest child. Frank Jr. took after his dad, and was one of the main reasons from retiring from the Marines. One day, the Castle family decided to have a picnic in Central Park to which they accidentally witness a mob execution and are gunned down. Frank Sr. is the only survivor with his family's death which sends him over the edge into being the Punisher. Since then, Frank Sr. continues to see Frank Jr. in dreams and visions as a driving force to continue a vigilante crusade as a reminder that the Punisher's work is never done. Frank Jr. was part of a resurrection scheme by Microchip and The Hood. Upon seeing his body alive, Frank torched his son to death with a flamethrower.

Frank Castle Jr. in other media
 The character appeared in the 2004 movie The Punisher renamed Will Castle, played by Marcus Johns. This version travels with his parents to Puerto Rico to celebrate Frank's retirement at a family reunion. Howard Saint, distraught over Bobby Saint's death, sends men to kill the entire Castle clan; Will gets run over with his mother by John Saint's truck.
 Frank Castle Jr. appeared in Netflix series set in the Marvel Cinematic Universe: 
 Frank Jr. is initially seen in season two of Daredevil in several of the photographs that Karen Page finds in Frank Castle's house.
 Frank Jr. made appearances during The Punisher, portrayed by Aidan Pierce Brennan. Flashbacks reveal that Frank Jr. idolized his dad, painting a mural of a Marine in their house and bragging that his dad was "killing Hajjis"; Frank was deeply disturbed by this and was convinced of being a bad influence on his son, especially since Frank himself suspected participating in war crimes.

Lisa Castle
Lisa Barbara Castle is the daughter of The Punisher in Marvel Comics. The character, created by Gerry Conway and Tony DeZuniga, first appeared in Marvel Preview  #2 (Aug. 1975).

Lisa was Frank Castle's daughter and oldest child. Lisa was the light in Frank's life and one of the main reasons from retiring from the Marines. One day, the Castle family decided to have a picnic in Central Park where they accidentally witness a mob execution and are gunned down. Frank being the only survivor of his family's death sends him over the edge into being the Punisher. Since then, Frank continues to see Lisa in dreams and visions as a driving force to continue a vigilante crusade and to remind the Punisher's work is never done. Lisa was part of a resurrection scheme by Microchip and Hood. Upon seeing her body alive, Frank torched his daughter to death with a flamethrower.

Lisa Castle in other media
 Two daughters named Annie Castle and Felice Castle appeared in the 1989 film The Punisher, played by Brooke Anderson and Holly Rogers respectively. Annie and Felice, as well as their mother, are killed in a car bomb.
 Lisa Castle appeared in the Netflix shows set in the Marvel Cinematic Universe: 
 Lisa is initially seen in season two of Daredevil in photographs that Karen Page finds when searching Frank Castle's house.
 Lisa appeared in flashbacks during The Punisher, portrayed by Nicolette Pierini.

Maria Castle
Maria Elizabeth Castle is the wife of Frank Castle in Marvel Comics. The character, created by Gerry Conway and Tony DeZuniga, first appeared in Marvel Preview  #2 (Aug. 1975).

Maria was Frank's loving wife. Together they had two children (Lisa Castle and Frank Castle Jr.) and maintained a very tranquil family life. After coming home from the war, Maria made sure that Frank's life was held together. One day, the Castle family decided to have a picnic in Central Park where they accidentally witness a mob execution and are gunned down. Frank survives but Maria and their children were killed. Since then, Frank continues to see Maria and their children in dreams and visions as a driving force to continue a vigilante crusade and as a reminder that the Punisher's work is never done. Years later, Maria and the children's bodies were resurrected along with Microchip's son by Hood using G. W. Bridge's body. Upon seeing his family revived, Frank took a flamethrower and burned them to death.

Maria Castle in other media
The character appeared in the 1989 film The Punisher renamed Julie Castle, played by May Lloyd. This version was killed in a car bomb alongside her and Frank Castle's two daughters.
Maria Castle appeared in the 2004 film The Punisher, played by Samantha Mathis. This version travels to Puerto Rico to celebrate her husband's retirement at a family reunion. Howard Saint, who is distraught over his youngest son, Bobby Saint's death, sends his men to kill the entire Castle family; Maria (and her and Frank's son) are run over by John Saint's truck.
Maria Castle appeared in the Netflix series set in the Marvel Cinematic Universe; 
Maria is initially seen in season two of Daredevil, portrayed by Lauren Gray Weinerth. She is in photographs that Karen Page finds in the family house.
Maria is seen in flashbacks and visions during The Punisher, where she was portrayed by Kelli Barrett.

Allies

Amy Bendix
Amy Bendix is a young girl. The character, created by Larry Hama and John Buscema, first appeared in The Punisher War Zone #24 (Feb. 1994).

Amy is a happy young girl who is mentally handicapped and lives in Laastekist. One day, she encounters Frank Castle (otherwise known as the Punisher) hiding underneath a truck. Castle asks Amy not to tell and she complies. Amy soon afterwards hides Castle in her tree house, where it becomes apparent that Amy reminds Castle of his daughter. Amy accidentally tells her father Sheriff Harry Bendix, who comes with two other officers to capture Castle. Against Amy's wishes, Harry beats up Castle, but puts Frank in jail afterwards. When Castle's fingerprints get leaked, several men break into Sheriff Bendix's house and hold Amy at gunpoint. Amy manages to escape the house and tries to look for her father, but is captured by anti-vigilante agent Taylor Blackwell. Castle manages to stall Blackwell long enough for Sheriff Bendix to snipe the man down saving Amy. She is carried away to safety and is last seen being left at a neighbor's house, while her father helps evacuate the town.

Amy Bendix in other media

 A version of Amy Bendix appeared in The Punisher, portrayed by Giorgia Whigham. This version is a teenage grifter, on the run after witnessing the murder of several of her friends. She is saved by Frank Castle when the killers attempt to kill her in a bar. Although initially hostile towards Castle, Amy is later taken under his wing and the two form a strong friendship.

Carlos Cruz
Carlos "CC" Cruz is a former SWAT/United States Navy SEALs who befriend Microchip who had a falling out with Frank Castle. Carlos' intentions where however to not kill when not needed keeping his military code. He and Microchip fought the good fight for a longer amount of time with Carlos swearing on his nephew's life that he'd protect the innocent.  Soon however, the Punisher broke out of the jail he was put in by Microchip. The Punisher confronted Microchip, but Micro was killed when an ex S.H.I.E.L.D. assassin named Stone Cold bombed the wall they were standing at. When Carlos returned from a mission and discovered the computer wiz's dead body, Carlos mistakenly blamed Castle for his friend's death. Carlos tracked Castle and found the true Punisher stalking a group of Bolivian drug dealer. Cruz attacked Castle, attracting the gun-fire of the Bolivians as well. Separated by the chaos of the battle, Cruz was executed by Microchip's true killer, Stone Cold. The real Punisher eventually avenged Carlos by killing Stone Cold himself.

Carlos Cruz in other media
Carlos Gonzalez-vlo portrays Carlos Cruz in Punisher: War Zone. In the film, Cruz was a minor criminal (of the gang "Latin Kings") until he became a friend of Microchip. He decided to change his way as he proves his sincerity to Microchip's other friend The Punisher by leading him to Maginty, an Irish criminal who knew information about Punisher's enemy Jigsaw's whereabouts.

The Punisher learns to trust Cruz and later, he ensures him with the lives of Angela Donatelli and her daughter Grace Donatelli, whom Jigsaw wanted to kidnap. When Loony Bin Jim tracks down The Punisher's hideout, Carlos tries to protect the women from him, but Jigsaw's brother Looney Bin Jim proves to be superior and slaughters him with an axe. When The Punisher comes back, he finds a dying Cruz, mourning for being unable to protect Angela and Grace. As an act of pity and respect, and at Cruz's request, Punisher finishes Carlos with a mercy gunshot.

Andy Lorimer
Andy Lorimer is a Lance Corporal in the Parachute Regiment of the British Army who tags along with Yorkie Mitchell to New York City to track down a group of former IRA members responsible for detonating a bomb in an Irish bar in Hell's Kitchen, also destroying a diner across the street, killing 11 and injuring 30, including Frank Castle who was dining at the restaurant. Lorimer & Mitchell link up with Castle and agree to fight alongside him against the Irish-American gangs of New York. Yorkie brought him along as a favor because one of the IRA members, Peter Cooley, killed Lorimer's father during the closing days of The Troubles. Lorimer's father, SAS Sergeant Major Stephen Lorimer, saved Yorkie's life in the past, and so he sees it as a way of repaying his fallen friend by allowing his son a chance to avenge his death. While a perfectly competent soldier, Lorimer begins to have doubts on the validity of their mission given how much killing is involved. Once their mission is complete and all of the IRA members and their associates have been killed, Lorimer is given the opportunity to execute Cooley. He does so, but upon returning to Yorkie, he tells him that his death did not bring him any sense of closure or satisfaction. The two return home to England.

George Howe
First appeared in The Punisher vol. 6 #55.

An African-American, George Howe served as a young man in the Vietnam War. In the summer of 1969, his UH-1 Huey helicopter crashed near the border with Laos; the Viet Cong soon arrived to take the survivors to their own base, where one by one they were killed, their hands and feet chopped off and tossed into Howe's bamboo cage. When it seemed that his time had come, a Marine Force Recon group led by Captain Castle attacked the village and rescued Howe. In 1972, Howe was awarded the Medal of Honor. Admiring the Force Recon Marines (Howe assumed his rescuers were SEALs or LURPs; many years later, Colonel Howe met Frank Castle in person and recognized him as the man that rescued him) for their proficiency, Howe joined the Green Berets for the remainder of the war and was among the first to join Delta Force. Howe is tasked by a cabal of military generals to arrest Castle, but then learns of the actual truth behind Castle's covert operation in Russia. Howe gives Castle the means of killing the generals by giving him a loaded M1911 handgun, and destroys the incriminating evidence out of the belief that if exposed, the U.S. military would lose all sense of credibility.

Howe's assistant, Lieutenant Geller, reads Castle's military record and realizes that not only was Castle a Force Recon Marine, he also led the team that saved Howe's life in Vietnam; thus, Howe would spare Castle's life as repayment out of gratitude. Geller attempts to warn the generals, but it is too late. As the generals arrive at Howe's safehouse to collect the incriminating tape and view Castle's body, Howe walks away, saying he has washed his hands clean of the matter, but in reality, Howe has lured the generals to their deaths.

Henry Russo
Henry Russo first appeared in The Punisher vol. 7 #1 (March 2009), and has gone on to become a recurring character in that series, as well as appearing alongside the Punisher in other series, such as Anti-Venom and Deadpool: Suicide Kings. Russo is the child of Jigsaw, and as a child, Russo's father would neglect and abuse him. In a pivotal incident, Jigsaw beat Russo for letting a cat inside their house. He then pulled a gun on Russo's mother and told him that if he did not drown the cat he (Jigsaw) would shoot her. Russo did, and was left traumatised by this incident.

Russo possesses no superhuman powers or abilities, although he is extremely skilled at using and hacking computers.

Jen Cooke
First appeared in The Punisher vol. 5 #24.

A liberal activist and social worker. She was kidnapped by a cult of tunnel dwelling homeless cannibals and was rescued by Castle, but condemned his brutal methods, pointing out that the men who kidnapped her were homeless, desperate and some with severe mental problems. While he initially shrugged off her tirade, she got to him and he gave the cultists a chance to escape while he went after their leader. Years later, she was investigating the East European sex slavery trade, and begrudgingly helped Castle go after a Romanian gang that was running a series of brothels.

Jenny Cesare
First appeared in The Punisher vol. 6 #43.

Jenny was born into the Cesare Crime Family and once she was old enough was introduced to her husband Tim Buccato by her sister Annabella and other Mafia wives. Tim seemed nice at first but after they were married he became extremely abusive both physically, sexually and mentally beginning on their wedding night. He beat her, raped her, and even allowed men he barely knew to come over and abuse her sexually. Jenny's sister and her friends knew he was like this before hand, but kept her in the relationship and didn't help at all. Finally Tim was killed by the Punisher and on that same day Jenny was diagnosed with breast cancer.

She told her sister that she was going to the FBI because she believed it was the evil in Tim that caused her cancer and it was Annabella's fault that she married him. Annabella's criminal partner Shauna Toomey knocked out Jenny and had two men from her husbands gang kill her but they didn't succeed in the disposal, she was thrown from a bridge after which they believed she was hit by a train but she in fact landed atop the train and survived. After coming to she realized she could start a new life and get revenge on the women who betrayed her.

She underwent a double mastectomy and learned weapon handling and cop skills over the years. She finally returned to New York City to get revenge on her sister and her friends, but found out they were planning on killing the Punisher in revenge for having killed all of their husbands. Wanting to save the life of the man that saved her by killing her husband, she rescued the Punisher and then donned the Punisher's death head shirt and took out the wives, ending with beating her sister to death with a baseball bat. After that was done, Jenny had sex with Frank in a last attempt to feel something and committed suicide when they were done, still unable to feel anything from the sex and aware she was still dying of cancer, leaving Frank forced to watch her shoot herself in the head while she was still sat astride him.

Jenny Cesare in other media
 Jenny Cesare appears as a NPC in PlayStation Network's The Punisher: No Mercy.

Joan
Joan is a fictional character in the Marvel Comics Universe. She first appeared in The Punisher vol. 4 #1.

A tenant in the apartment building where Frank Castle lived for a time under the name of John Smith. An extremely shy, frightened and timid character, Joan was terrified of living in the city and wished to move to the countryside, but did not have the money to do so. She had a bit of a crush on Castle, baking him pies and cookies and claiming she had merely made too many. Along with her friends, Bumpo and Spacker Dave, she receives a portion of Gnucci's money which she used to buy a cottage in the countryside as she wanted. Years later, Castle was wounded in a fight with the Russian mob and stumbled upon her abode. She tended to him, and, despite his request that she run for her life and leave him to fend for himself, insisted on helping him instead.

Joan in other media
 Joan appears in The Punisher portrayed by Rebecca Romijn. Joan is depicted as being much prettier than her comic book counterpart. Though she is still shy, she is more willing to approach Castle along with Dave and Bumpo. She also had an ex-boyfriend who was abusive and she leaves him, but he follows her. As she prepares to defend herself with a knife, Castle arrives and gets rid of him. She witnesses Castle's fight with The Russian and nurses him back to health. After a dinner as thanks for helping get rid of her ex; she tries to act more on her feelings for Frank, but he gently rejects her, telling her he's "not what she's looking for." As Frank goes on his raid and Punishment against Howard Saint and his goons, Joan attempts to stop him, clearly worried that he won't make it out alive. Just like in the comic, Castle leaves all the money he racked up from the criminals he punished to Joan, Dave and Bumpo.
 Joan appears in The Punisher video game voiced by Julie Nathanson.

Kathryn O'Brien
First appeared in The Punisher vol. 6 #1.

O'Brien first appeared as a CIA agent and part of a task force to apprehend him and recruit him into the hunt for Osama bin Laden, when she expressed sexual attraction to Castle and a desire to sleep with him. The mission ultimately failed, and O'Brien's superior had her sent to prison. During her time there, she was routinely harassed by a gang of inmates, who were never able to beat her in a fight, so they framed her for the murder of a guard instead. O'Brien fled the prison and went to a fellow former CIA Agent for help, and once there, she learned of the events surrounding Nicky Cavella's desecration of the Castle family graves, and that Bill Rawlins, her ex-husband, was in town. Deciding to kill her husband before she could make good her escape, she caught him as he was about to shoot Castle with a sniper rifle, as he and Cavella were in league. O'Brien assisted Castle in interrogating her ex-husband in his role for the covert operation in Russia. She then disappeared to Afghanistan to kill ex-Taliban officers under American and British protection for playing a role in raping her. O'Brien was killed when she stepped on a land mine, being cared for by Castle during her final moments. Prior to her disappearance, O'Brien gave birth to a daughter named Sarah, the product of a one-night stand with Castle, who is in the protective custody of her sister.

She revealed to Castle that the CIA recruited had her in her senior year at Princeton University.

Lynn Michaels

Martin Soap

Max
Max is an attack dog owned by the Punisher. Created by Mike Baron, he first appeared in The Punisher vol. 2 #54 (Nov. 1991). Max was a puppy that was picked up off the street to be trained as an attack dog. One day a local gang broke into the building Max was kept in and attacked the crooks. The Punisher arrived and defeated the last one before adopting the dog as his own. Since then, Max had become a close companion to Frank Castle and even Micro to an extent. Even when Max was stolen away to be trained in dog fights, he never forgot his true master and was quick to return to him.

Max in other media
Max appears in season two of Daredevil played by dog actor Bull. The Punisher rescues Max from the Kitchen Irish after gunning down the majority of them. Later, Finn Cooley kidnaps Max and threatens to torture him if Frank does not give up the location of his money. What happens to Max afterward is unknown.

Mickey Fondozzi

Microchip

Molly von Richthofen
NYPD Lieutenant Molly Elizabeth Chrysanthema Olga von Richthofen first appeared in The Punisher vol. 4 #4. She is a talented investigator who, as punishment for refusing to sleep with the NYPD Commissioner, was assigned to take down the Gnucci crime family, which was as much a farce as Detective Martin Soap's Punisher Task Force. It was her idea to team up with Soap, knowing that either Ma Gnucci or the Punisher would kill the other, and then they could move in and arrest whoever was left. During their investigation, Soap fell in love with Molly, who rebuffed Soap, since Molly is a lesbian. When Soap later became Commissioner, Molly left on a vacation in the tropics with a stripper and was preparing for her mayoral campaign.

A few years later, von Richthofen returned to New York and rejoined the NYPD. However, she was still disfavored by her male superiors and was assigned to the Punisher Task Force, since Molly previously served in that job. Ironically, Molly was later forced to fight alongside Castle against Elite's henchmen; during the ensuing battle, Molly's clothes caught fire and she was forced to strip to her bra and panties. Unfortunately for Molly, the gunfight was recorded by the local news media and she was publicly exposed as a Punisher sympathizer. Molly was subsequently suspended, pending a formal investigation.

Staci Strobl and Nickie D. Phillips examined the character in their book Comic Book Crime: Truth, Justice, and the American Way, noting her "lesbian as psychopath" motif The Punisher: War Zone vol. 2, and writing, "Molly's violence may be interpreted as rage against the patriarchal constraints under which she operates both at work and at home, and is always infused, at least implicitly, with her sexuality. While Molly is certainly a competent law enforcement officer, her honor and integrity are belied by her abuse of power. Violence is used as one means of negotiating her sexual orientation, which is never far removed from her objectification as a female. In her confrontation with the Mafia, she partners with Punisher and in the process undergoes numerous humiliations culminating in a "bra and panties" showdown captured by the media. There is space for the lesbian crime fighter, but only firmly in its place within masculine hegemony. As The New York Globe headlines reported the showdown, "Lethal Weapons! Sexy Lesbian Lieutenant in Punisher Team-Up Carnage!"

Molly von Richthofen in other media
Molly von Richthofen appears in The Punisher video game, voiced by Julie Nathanson.

Nathaniel Bumpo
Nathaniel Bumpo is a fictional character in the Marvel Comics Universe. He first appeared in The Punisher vol. 4 #1.

A tenant in the apartment building where Frank Castle lived for a time under the name of John Smith. Grossly overweight and requiring Castle's help to get through the door of his apartment, Mr. Bumpo once suffered a heart attack and the paramedics had to destroy part of the building's wall and use a crane to take him to the hospital. Shortly after he was released, the Russian attacked Castle at his home. After a vicious fight, Castle used Bumpo to smother him, doing so for thirty minutes. Castle later left him a share of Gnucci's money, and was said by Joan to be living in a clinic in Albany after "something important fell out of his bottom".

Nathaniel Bumpo in other media
Nathaniel Bumpo appears in The Punisher, portrayed by John Pinette. While still overweight, this version does not have trouble with his living quarters. He is much more comical and is always trying to humor Joan along with Spacker Dave. Just like in the comic, the Punisher leaves all the money racked up from punished criminals and leaves them to Joan, Dave and Bumpo.

Oscar Clemons

Det. Oscar "Ozzy" Clemons first appeared in The Punisher #1 (Oct. 2011), created by Greg Rucka and Marco Checchetto in the likeness of Morgan Freeman.

Oscar Clemons had a personal grudge against the Punisher due to a botched case. Clemons has since held on to a knife that he obtained from that case. He was paired up with the younger detective Walter Bolt to investigate the recent massacre of a wedding with the sole survivor being the bride Rachel Cole. Clemons and Bolt meet with Rachel to get information, but cause Cole to become manic after learning the woman's husband died. Soon after, they witness the Punisher battling and killing the Vulture (Jimmy Natale) and investigate the crime scene with Carlie Cooper afterwards. Clemons and Bolt soon begin investigating the possibility that the Punisher has a partner whom they believe to be Rachel. They hold a stakeout outside Cole's apartment and are later approached by Norah Winters who lies to them about having seen Rachel. Clemons realizes that the Punisher and Rachel are after Christian Poulsen and his suspicions are proven true when two cops are killed (the Punisher does not kill cops). But during a police raid, Bolt is accidentally killed by Rachel. Despite this, Clemons tries to convince the police captain that Poulsen's actions are what caused Rachel to act irrationally. After a lengthy chase, Clemons captures Rachel after the woman attempts to die by police fire which is thwarted by the Punisher who removed the gun pins.

Oscar Clemons in other media
Oscar Clemons appears in Jessica Jones, portrayed by Clarke Peters. This version is a veteran detective, and is two years away from mandatory retirement with a full pension. He is the detective assigned to the murders of Bob Schlottman and Barbara Schlottman, shot to death in an elevator by their daughter Hope on Kilgrave's orders. After Kilgrave kills the neighbor Ruben, Jessica Jones approaches Clemons with Ruben's severed head, begging to be locked up. This backfires, as Kilgrave arrives and orders Clemons and the other cops present at the time to all point guns at each other, then makes them dismiss the incident as a hilarious prank. Later, Jessica brings Clemons to a decommissioned CDC facility where Kilgrave is being contained in a sealed room, but Trish Walker is forced to handcuff him. When Kilgrave escapes, he tells Clemons to remove himself from the cuffs, breaking his hand in the process. While securing the scene, Clemons is confronted by Will Simpson looking for Trish and Kilgrave. After getting Clemons to reveal Trish's location, Simpson shoots Clemons in the head, killing him instantly. Simpson then douses the floor in gasoline and torches the building. Jessica later learns about Clemons's murder when his body turns up at the morgue. Jessica initially suspects that Kilgrave killed Clemons, but quickly figures out Simpson was responsible.

Paul Budiansky

Paul Budiansky first appeared in The Punisher vol. 7 #44 (March 2007, created by Garth Ennis and Lan Medina. He was an impulsive man who felt that in order to solve a problem, you had to take matters into your own hands. A NYPD police officer, Paul heroically entered a school that was being held hostage by a deranged killer against orders and shot him. Despite this, he was disciplined and forced into therapy, wondering if he was like the Punisher. Paul then began investigating a gang of supposed criminals, The Five Wives. The Wives were accused of killing one of their own which they denied. Certain of their crime he investigated deeper and the Wives sent a hitman after him.

While visiting his wife Gina in the hospital, the hitman attempted to kill Paul, but accidentally shot Gina. Paul brutally killed the hitman and Gina survived, but was put on life-support. Having had enough, Paul visited the Wives in an effort to get revenge, only to discover that Jenny Cesare had killed three of the Wives and was taking the last one to be killed. Paul followed, but ran into the Punisher and demanded that he be let through causing the Punisher to ask, "You want to be me?" Following these words, Paul gave up, realizing he was not the Punisher.

Paul Budiansky in other media
 Paul Budiansky appears in Punisher: War Zone, portrayed by Colin Salmon. This version is a former narcotics specialist for the FBI who snorted the cocaine that they collected. His partner Nicky Donatelli refused to turn his friend in and went undercover to out the local gangs. Paul overcame his addiction, but Nicky was accidentally killed by the Punisher during a bust gone bad under the Russoti Family mission. He teams up with Martin Soap and the "Punisher Task Force" to bring the Punisher to justice. Unbeknownst to Paul, however, Soap and the NYPD are sympathetic to the vigilante and are simply pretending to be hunting the Punisher. As soon as Paul captures and arrests the Punisher, Soap secretly lets the vigilante escape. When Paul realizes that the system does not work, the Punisher ends up getting help to take down notorious gangster and megalomaniac Jigsaw.
 Paul Budiansky is mentioned in The Punisher: No Mercy.

Rachel Cole-Alves

Shotgun

Spacker Dave
First appeared in The Punisher vol. 4 #1.

A heavily pierced young tenant in the apartment building where Castle lived for a time under the alias of John Smith. He did little but hang about on the building's doorstep, but recognized "Smith" as the Punisher, something which he inadvertently divulged to mobsters who came looking for him. Despite being tortured by having his piercings pulled out and carving his name into his forehead, he did not betray Castle. He received a portion of Ma Gnucci's money after leaving the hospital, and later inspired an underground movement called the "Spackers" who had bandaged faces similar to his. He reappeared years later, now no longer wearing any piercings or bandages, and had taken up the hobby of superhero spotting, much to Castle's chagrin. Dave was ecstatic when he met Daredevil, Spider-Man and Wolverine in the flesh. He was trampled by the Hulk, rendering him quadriplegic, which does not hamper his fascination with superheroes.

Spacker Dave in other media
 Spacker Dave appears in The Punisher played by Ben Foster. His character remains relatively unchanged (his torture scene is even reenacted), but is also more comical than his comic book counterpart. He even tries to humor Joan on occasion along with Bumpo. Just like in the comic, Castle leaves all the money he racked up from the criminals he punished and leaves them to Joan, Dave and Bumpo.
 Spacker Dave appears in The Punisher video game, voiced by Chris Edgerly.

Steve Goodwin
First appeared in The Punisher: Born #1.

A young Marine serving under then-Captain Frank Castle at Firebase Valley Forge near the Cambodian border toward the end of Castle's third tour in Vietnam. He was one of the better natured U.S. Marines at the base, keeping away from drugs and taking the time to ease the springs in the magazines of his rifle. His tour of Vietnam was coming to an end, and he clung to Castle in a desperate attempt to stay alive, believing that Castle's prowess as a combatant would guarantee his safety. The events of The Punisher: Born are told largely from his perspective and narrated by him. On the night he was thirty-seven days from being discharged, the garrison was attacked by combined forces of NVA and Viet Cong. Of the Marines, Castle and Goodwin held out the longest, and Goodwin got to see air support arrive, only to be bayoneted seconds later. In his dying moments, he hallucinates of the bayonet missing him, being whisked away onto a passenger jet where he is tended to by attractive stewardesses as he previously wished.

Nearly forty years later, his younger brother Michael Goodwin writes a book titled Valley Forge, Valley Forge: The Slaughter of a U.S. Marine Garrison and the Birth of the Punisher about the events surrounding those final hours.

Yorkie Mitchell
First appeared in The Punisher vol. 5 #18.

Lieutenant Colonel Yorkie Mitchell was an operative of MI6 and the SAS. Yorkie first met Castle in 1971, while they were serving in Vietnam, when they were both taking part in a cross-training exercise with the Australian SAS. On one occasion, Yorkie saved Castle from being burned alive by the Viet Cong. He once helped Castle by supplying information about a cocaine shipment that had made its way into Belfast, Northern Ireland, and later teamed up with him to take down Finn Cooley, a former Provisional IRA terrorist and current Irish gangster. He then was assigned to Afghanistan, where he provided security to ex-Taliban who had turned into informants for the coalition. As a favor to Castle, he was able to secure the release of Kathryn O'Brien after he was supposed to execute her, an act that cost him his job. He did not mind it, however, expressing that he wanted to retire anyway. He and his wife were later murdered by Barracuda, who was looking for leverage against Castle.

Enemies

Barracuda

Cristu Bulat
Cristu Bulat was a character in Marvel Comics. He first appeared in The Punisher vol. 6 #25. He was a Romanian criminal specializing in brothels where East European abductees are forced into prostitution. Son of notorious Yugoslav Wars freedom fighter & crime boss Tiberiu Bulat. He was eviscerated alive by the Punisher for information.

Cristu Bulat in other media
Cristu Bulat appears in Punisher: War Zone portrayed by David Vadim. He is a rival gangster to the Cesares which is taken over Jigsaw. Cristu planned to import biological weapons into the states which Jigsaw planned to buy from him. Later upon doing so, Jigsaw sells Cristu out to the Feds and he is arrested.

Damage

Elite
The original Elite first appeared in The Punisher vol. 4 #5. His son Tim, the second Elite, first appeared in The Punisher: War Zone vol. 2 #1 (2009).

The first Elite was a fascist and racist vigilante who killed gang members, drug dealers and other criminals who "lower the tone" in his upper-class neighborhood. He even shot a lady's dog that urinated on the sidewalk and ran off a hot dog vendor who had set up shop in Elite's neighborhood by tossing a live grenade in the vendor's cart. Nevertheless, Elite was well-spoken: he was actually polite to his victims. Elite was the manager of an art gallery and had a wife, a son named Tim and a daughter. Elite later joined up with Mr. Payback and the Holy to form the Vigilante Squad, planning to exterminate all of New York City's criminals.

When the Punisher confronted the Vigilante Squad, he called Elite "a Nazi". Elite was gunned down by the Punisher seconds later: he was shot at least eight times at point-blank range by the Punisher's Uzi.

Elite's widow later remarried & his daughter suffered a mental breakdown and was sent to an insane asylum, but Tim inherited his father's wealth & possessions and eventually went to Princeton. Like his father, Tim was an arrogant, racist snob who hated minorities & the less fortunate; while high on cocaine, Tim used his Porsche to run over a homeless man who got in his way, but the homeless man survived and Tim was arrested, convicted of attempted murder, sent to prison and expelled from Princeton.

Six years after his father's death, Tim took up his father's alter ego and vowed to avenge his father's murder at the hands of the Punisher. Elite set up an elaborate scheme that at first, made Castle believe his old nemesis, Ma Gnucci, was still alive: Elite used several cosmetically-altered body-doubles of Ma to convince several mob families to assist him in eliminating the Punisher, but in the end Castle discovered Elite's scheme. Aided by NYPD Lieutenant Molly von Richtofen, Castle & Molly killed all of Elite's mob allies. Castle then killed Elite's henchmen & confronted Elite himself, telling him "What makes you think they haunt me?" Elite, too shocked to resist, could only say "Whuh...what?" Castle replied "Go", then executed Elite.

Finn Cooley
Finn Cooley is a fictional character in the Marvel Comics Universe. He first appeared in The Punisher vol. 6 #7.

A hideously disfigured Irish terrorist, an Irish mob boss and a demolitions expert, Cooley was formerly an Active Service Unit leader with the Provisional IRA in Derry, Northern Ireland, from 1986 to 1993, when he was arrested, interrogated by the Royal Ulster Constabulary (RUC) at Castlereagh, convicted of murder & terrorism and sent to prison, but was released as part of the Good Friday Agreement in 1998. After Cooley was freed, he tried to join the Continuity IRA, but that unit disavowed him, so Finn came to America. Cooley had to wear a facial mask as half of his face was blown off in an explosives accident, when the bomb he planted at a Belfast RUC police station prematurely detonated. He was also an expert in hand-to-hand combat. In 2003, Cooley planted fifty pounds of Semtex at an Irish bar in Hell's Kitchen in order to kill several rival Irish mob bosses, but the bomb went off prematurely, killing 11 and injuring 30 innocent people, one of whom was Frank Castle; Castle's friend MI6 agent Yorkie Mitchell informed Castle who was responsible and provided MI6's intel files on Cooley and his associates; MI6 also ordered Mitchell to assassinate Cooley. Cooley was ironically killed by a bomb left behind by recently deceased Irish mob boss Pops Nesbitt, who thought Cooley and his rivals were unworthy of inheriting his fortune. Cooley had a nephew, Peter Cooley, who was a Provisional IRA soldier from 1994 to 1998, who served as his uncle's right-hand man, and was a prime suspect in the murders of three British security forces soldiers, but was never arrested or convicted; one of the victims was Sergeant Major Stephen Lorimer, a close friend of Mitchell. Peter was captured by Castle & Mitchell, interrogated for information about Finn and the New York Irish mob leaders, then executed by Parachute Regiment trooper Lance Corporal Andy Lorimer, in revenge for his father's murder.

Finn Cooley in other media
 Finn Cooley appears as a playable character in PlayStation Network's The Punisher: No Mercy.
 Finn Cooley appears in season two of Daredevil, portrayed by Tony Curran. This version is hotheaded and impulsive, introduced stabbing an underling in the eye with an ice pick for trivializing his son Kelly Cooley's death at the hands of the Punisher who also stole several million dollars from the Kitchen Irish. Finn puts out a bounty, with his men shaking down business owners until they locate the Punisher's hideout and the vigilante's dog. Finn and his men capture the Punisher at the carousel where the Castle family was killed and haul the Punisher to a catacomb. Finn proceeds tortures Punisher by drilling through the vigilante's left foot but refuses to cooperate with him. He finally gets an answer when he threatens to give the same treatment to the vigilante's dog which had been rescued from the Irish. The stolen money turns out to be placed on top of a bomb and the money is destroyed. Punisher then breaks free, grabs a shotgun and asks Finn for answers about the Castle family's death. Finn refuses to talk, saying "Your family? Who cares!", prompting the Punisher to shoot fatally him point-blank, blowing off the left side of his face. The Punisher is pinned down by gunfire from several of Finn's remaining henchmen until Daredevil, tipped off by Sgt. Brett Mahoney about Finn's activities, shows up to rescue.

General Kreigkopf
First appeared in The Punisher vol. 5 #2.

A former United States Marine Corps General who was infamous for committing war atrocities, later becoming a terrorist leader. During the Vietnam War, Lieutenant Kreigkopf allowed his Marines to pillage the town of Ap Duc and rape its women, as a reward for defending the town. In the 1980s, during the Contra War, Major Kreigkopf was directly responsible for the deaths of 426 Sandinistas, two-thirds of which were killed with nerve agents. During Operation Desert Storm, Colonel Kreigkopf ordered his Marines to use half of a company of Iraqi prisoners for bayonet practice. However, none of the war crimes were ever proven, a testament to Kreigkopf's influence with military leaders.

As a General, Kreigkopf did the unthinkable: he struck a Lance Corporal in the neck with a rifle butt, rendering the young Marine permanently paralyzed from the neck down, for insubordination. Worse, the entire incident was filmed by a CNN camera team. Before Kreigkopf could face a court-martial, he was smuggled out of the United States by the CIA, as he was considered a valuable asset by them, for conducting black ops on their behalf. Nevertheless, the court-martial proceeded with Kreigkopf in absentia: he was dismissed from the Marine Corps and stripped of rank.

Kreigkopf fled to Grand Nixon Island in the South Pacific, where he established a mercenary base and hired disgraced special forces & black ops operators, hitmen and sociopaths, as mercenaries and terrorists; a "black ops for hire" outfit, as Frank Castle put it. The most notable of these mercenaries was The Russian, who was recently murdered by the Punisher, and resurrected with cyborg technology stolen from S.H.I.E.L.D. As "payment" for his services, Kreigkopf allowed the Russian one more chance to kill the Punisher in revenge; the Russian failed in his mission and returned to Grand Nixon Island in time for Kreigkopf's plot to eliminate the European Union (EU) leaders in Brussels, as revenge for their plotting to wipe out Kreigkopf and his terrorist group. When the Punisher foiled Kreigkopf's plot by shooting down a Boeing 747 full of terrorists, Kreigkopf ordered the hijacking of a French military aircraft that was carrying a hydrogen bomb and have it destroy the EU leaders. As the French aircraft began to taxi down the runway, the Punisher confronted Kreigkopf on the runway and shot him in the shoulder, then Castle managed to board the aircraft and throw the Russian out with the nuclear weapon chained to him. Kreigkopf  watches and he yells in anger and horror that the Punisher destroyed his plans and the Punisher kills him with the nuclear weapon. The resulting nuclear explosion destroyed Grand Nixon Island, the terrorists, the Russian and Kreigkopf.

Two weeks later, the Punisher broke into the White House and directly confronted the President of the United States, who had been blackmailed by Kreigkopf; Kreigkopf had threatened to inform the media of black ops authorized by the President, the least of which was authorizing the Russian to eliminate the Punisher, and ordering the NYPD not to interfere. The Punisher gave the President a stern warning, and threw a 9mm Parabellum round on the President's desk, saying "Nine millimeters. I'm never further away than that."

"Kreigkopf" is German for "Warhead", a double entendre, referring to Kreigkopf's propensity for brutality, and the fact he confiscated a nuclear weapon.

General Kreigkopf in other media
Kreigkopf appeared in the 2005 The Punisher video game, voiced by Bob Joles. He appears as one of the game's main antagonists.

Hitman

Holy
First appeared in The Punisher vol. 4 #2.

Father Hector Redondo, who called himself "The Holy", was an insane Catholic priest in Spanish Harlem who used a fireman's axe to kill criminals who confessed their sins to him. He believed killing "evil" people is God's will, and was later inspired by the Punisher to form the Vigilante Squad, consisting of the Holy, Elite and Mr. Payback (the trio hoped that the Punisher would join and lead them). The media called him the mystery "Axe-Murderer of Spanish Harlem". Father Redondo realized that he was a killer and showed remorse after each of his murders, praying for absolution and forgiveness for his sins, only to subsequently commit more murders and pray after each one.

The Punisher used Detective Soap's notes to find Father Redondo, whose church was the place where all of the victims came to confess their sins. Not only did Castle find The Holy, but also Elite and Mr. Payback. By listening to their conversation, the Punisher found out Redondo was indeed the Axe-Murderer. The Punisher barged into The Holy's office to confront the Vigilante Squad, who attempted to recruit the Punisher as their leader, but Castle was unmoved by their pleas, accusing Redondo of being "a lunatic". Just after Redondo made the trio's final plea with the Punisher to reconsider, Castle gunned down all three members of the Vigilante Squad.

Ink
Ink was one of Nicky Cavella's bodyguards/enforcers, and was always paired with Pittsy. He first appeared in The Punisher vol. 6 #2. Ink received his nickname when he killed his first man by stabbing a pen through the man's eye and into his brain. Ink was slightly cross-eyed and always wore glasses. Like his partner Pittsy, Ink was just as callous and ruthless; however, Ink rarely spoke, but when he did, Cavella referred to Ink as a real "ballbuster". Ink was a skilled cook: he murdered, then butchered and cooked up the son of mob boss David Kai, who enjoyed his "sweet & sour pork" until Cavella told him what it really was. Ink's favorite word was "Huh", which he used whenever he agreed with something; it was also his last word when he was killed during a battle between Cavella's mobsters & CIA agents who were negotiating with Frank Castle; Cavella & Pittsy barely escaped with their lives, but were forced to leave Ink's body behind.

Ink in other media
Ink appears in 2008's Punisher: War Zone, portrayed by Keram Malicki-Sánchez. The son of Pittsy and an enforcer for Jigsaw, this version was a young man who regularly snorted cocaine which would be his undoing as the Punisher catches him off guard and kills him by punching him really hard in the face.

Jigsaw

Kingpin

Maginty
Maginty first appeared in The Punisher vol. 6 #8. An Afro–Irish crime lord in Hell's Kitchen, he was one of the four gang lords who would receive a share of Pops Nesbitt's fortune, which turned out to be a bomb, killing Maginty and the other gang leaders.

Maginty in other media
Maginty appears in Punisher: War Zone portrayed by T. J. Storm. He works for Billy Russoti and partakes in parkour alongside his two comrades. The Punisher shoots Maginty in the knees for information on Russoti. Afterwards, the Punisher drops Maginty on a spiked fence and finishes him off by breaking his neck.

Ma Gnucci

Olivier

Mr. Payback
First appeared in The Punisher vol. 4 #5.

A vigilante who despised corporations and the corrupt, especially those who disregard the safety and well-being of the working class. He gunned down the entire Board of Directors of the World-Wide Investment Corporation (WIC); Payback later used a FIM-92 Stinger missile to destroy a WIC helicopter that killed the company's CEO, attorney and helicopter pilot. He also executed a wealthy banker who criticized Payback during a live TV news interview. Payback was highly intelligent: he made several highly articulate speeches about the exploitation of corporate laborers; shortly thereafter, Payback deduced the location of Elite's neighborhood and found Elite gunning down a marijuana dealer. Payback convinced Elite to join him, and the duo stumbled across The Holy, forming the Vigilante Squad.

Just as the Vigilante Squad decided that they needed the Punisher to lead them, the topic of discussion himself stormed into the room. An awed Mr. Payback told the Punisher that he was their inspiration. After insulting The Holy and Elite, the Punisher informed Payback that he had killed four innocent people during his quest for justice, to which Payback responded that there have to be sacrifices in war. After Payback gave the wrong answer, the Punisher pulled out his trademark Uzi and prepared to gun down the trio, who pleaded with the Punisher to reconsider their offer. Mr. Payback, along with the rest of the Vigilante Squad, died seconds later.

Nicky Cavella
Nicolas "Nicky" Cavella first appeared in The Punisher vol. 6 #2. He was a psychotic captain in the Cesare crime family. At the age of eight, he killed his father, mother and sister, then framed his uncle for the murders at the suggestion of his aunt in order for her to become captain of the Cavella family; when Nicky turned 18, she took him as a lover and protege until he one day smothered her to death, thus becoming capo of his family. He was one of the few criminals to have survived an encounter with the Punisher. However, when he desecrated the Castle family's graves to lure out the Punisher so he can kill him once and for all, he was kidnapped by the Punisher, marched into the woods by Castle and shot in the belly, leaving him there to languish for days, dying slowly of blood poisoning. Cavella portrayed himself as a charismatic, suave killer but is really an emotionally unstable coward.

Nicky Calvella in other media
Romano Orzari portrays Nicky Calvella in Punisher: War Zone as Billy Russoti's top henchman who is revealed to be Nicky Donatelli, an FBI agent.

Carmine "Pittsy" Gazzera
Carmine "Pittsy" Gazzera was one of Nicky Cavella's bodyguards/enforcers, always paired with Ink. He first appeared in The Punisher vol. 6 #2. Pittsy once worked as an enforcer for "Ray the Rat", then began serving Cavella when the latter became a soldier and scion of his family. Pittsy was extremely rude, profane and merciless, but was completely loyal to Cavella. He had an extremely high pain threshold & endurance, on a level comparable to the Punisher himself, and was a very capable hand-to-hand combatant. During a three-way firefight between the Punisher, the CIA and Cavella's men, the Punisher threw Pittsy through a warehouse window and impaled him upon a spiked fence. To Castle's disbelief, Pittsy staggered towards Castle with a section of the fence still imbedded in him; Castle finished off Pittsy with a point-blank shotgun blast to the face. Shortly after Pittsy's death, his younger sister Teresa "Tessie" replaced her brother as Cavella's bodyguard. Tessie had the same rude & cold-blooded personality as her brother, but became enamored of Cavella and tried to seduce him; Cavella rebuffed Tessie's advances. Shortly thereafter, Tessie tracked down Frank Castle, who was in bed with Kathryn O'Brien, and attacked them both, managing to stab Castle in the shoulder while screaming that Castle had killed her brother. O'Brien managed to pick up a pistol and repeatedly shot Tessie in the face, killing her.

Pittsy in other media
Pittsy appears in 2008's Punisher: War Zone, portrayed by Mark Camacho. He was Ink's father and served as Jigsaw's right-hand man. After being disarmed, Paul Budiansky attempts to arrest him only for the Punisher to shoot his face off with a shotgun.

Robert Hellsgaard
First appeared in Punisher vol. 7 #11.

Robert Hellsgaard was a brilliant engineer in 1898 who came home to discover that his family was killed by werewolves. Ever since that day, he formed the Hunter of Monster Special Forces to exterminate monsters and has since resided in the armor he made. After exterminating Monster Isle, he and forces arrived in Monster Metropolis where he ran afoul of Punisher's Frankencastle form and the Legion of Monsters.

Rosalie Carbone

The Russian

Tiberiu Bulat
First appeared in The Punisher vol. 6 #26.

Cristu Bulat's father, with whom he fought in the Yugoslav Wars with the Serbs. They eventually went to the West, where they set up a series of brothels where East European abductees are forced into prostitution. He was burned alive by Castle, who had the murder recorded and sent to Bulat's associates in Moldova as a warning not to mess with the Punisher.

Tiberiu Bulat in other media
Tiberiu Bulat appears in Punisher: War Zone portrayed by Aubert Pallascio. The Punisher informs Tiberiu of his son's incarceration as a result of a bust deal with Jigsaw. He decides to help the Punisher out by sending his men into the lobby of Jigsaw's hideout, the Bradstreet Hotel, and start a distraction for the Punisher to enter and kill Jigsaw.

Tony Pizzo
First appeared in The Punisher vol. 6 #19.

A young and inexperienced gangster who becomes a Mafia captain due to the Punisher killing most of New York City's veteran mafiosi. Pizzo first appears at a sit-down with Nicky Cavella and a few other captains; he and the other captains agree to make Cavella their boss so he can help them kill the Punisher and rebuild the Mafia. After an attempt to kill the Punisher fails miserably due to interference by CIA agent Kathryn O'Brien, Pizzo and the rest of the surviving Mafiosi turn on Cavella and leave him on his own for the Punisher to kill him. Pizzo appears several issues later in the "Widowmaker" story arc when one of the widows seduces him in order to find out about a Mafia convoy escorting a replacement boss into New York City; the Punisher finds out about this as well and attacks the convoy, killing everyone including Pizzo and the replacement boss.

Ray Schoonover
Colonel Ray Schoonover is a fictional character in Marvel Comics. The character created by Carl Potts, John Wellington and Jim Lee, first appeared in The Punisher War Journal #4 (March 1988)

Schoonover was Frank Castle's former commanding officer during the Vietnam War. On the side, he was secretly running a drug smuggling ring. While running for U.S. Senate, he hired the Sniper to take out anyone who knew his secret. The Punisher found out and forced him to confess; Schoonover promptly committed suicide afterwards.

Ray Schoonover in other media
Ray Schoonover appeared in Netflix TV shows, portrayed by Clancy Brown:
 The character appeared in season two of Daredevil. Initially depicted as Frank Castle's former commanding officer who has deep respect, this iteration is also a drug runner known as the Blacksmith and the one behind the shootout in which the Castle family was killed. When Frank goes on trial for vigilante work, Schoonover acts as a character witness and calls Castle a hero. When Wilson Fisk arranges for Frank to escape from Rikers Island, the Blacksmith tries to frame Castle, and orders the murders of district attorney Samantha Reyes and the medical examiner that had been paid to falsify reports on the Castle family. His men also attempt to kill Karen Page at the woman's apartment. When that attempt fails, two of his men follow Karen to a diner, but Frank sees this coming and kills both men. After Frank is seemingly killed when a boat carrying in the Blacksmith's drugs is blown up, Karen visits Schoonover at his house to interview about Frank. Midway through the interview, Karen notices a photo of Schoonover posing with a soldier that Karen recognizes as one of the bodies seen at the docks after the boat explosion, and realizes Schoonover is the Blacksmith. Schoonover pulls a gun on Karen to drive at gunpoint but Frank (having followed Karen) crashes a truck into the car. Frank then drags Schoonover to a nearby weapons arsenal and (over Karen's protests) kills by shooting him in the head.
 Schoonover appeared in season one of The Punisher. During flashbacks to Frank's time in the Marines, It's established that he, William Rawlins, and Colonel Morty Bennett ran Operation: Cerberus, an illegal black ops unit consisting of Frank, Billy Russo, Gunner Henderson and more that was funded by the heroin they were smuggling inside the corpses of KIAs. It is revealed that Schoonover lost his right arm to a mortar blast after he and Rawlins disregarded Frank's concerns about a mission that were deduced to be an ambush.

Stone Cold
Derek Smalls/Stone Cold is a fictional character in the Marvel Comics Universe, created by Steven Grant, Chuck Dixon and Hugh Haynes, first appeared in The Punisher: War Journal #76 (March 1995).

Derek Smalls was a former veteran S.H.I.E.L.D. agent selected for a process to take down this government agency monitoring called Vigilante Infraction General Interdiction and Limitation (VIGIL). VIGIL's task primarily located several vigilantes including the Punisher, Lynn Michaels and Microchip. Smalls now turned assassin for hire under the title "Stone Cold" activated the program and is the mercenary responsible for the deaths of ex-Marine Carlos Cruz and Punisher's former ally Microchip. Smalls was monitoring Punisher's fight with Bullseye at Coney Island, and was prepared to kill Castle. However Castle's old ally Shotgun murdered Stone Cold, as he was brought in by Nick Fury to retrieve the data from Smalls and save Castle.

Curtis Hoyle
Curtis Hoyle is a fictional character in the Marvel Comics Universe. He first appeared in The Punisher #1 (July 1987), and was created by writer Mike Baron and artist Klaus Janson.

A lieutenant in the Vietnam War, Hoyle fought alongside Frank Castle before returning home to the U.S. where they parted ways. Hoyle turned to a life of crime with the Rockhouse Corporation where he quickly rose in the ranks to be second in command. He reunited with Castle disguised himself hoping to get close to Hoyle's boss. However, Hoyle saw through Castle's disguise and tried to kill the man. Hoyle was no match for Castle who threw him out of a helicopter to his death.

Curtis Hoyle in other media
Curtis Hoyle appeared in The Punisher, portrayed by Jason R. Moore. He has a prosthetic leg, having lost the lower portion of his left leg to an IED, and still maintains contact with Frank Castle after their service. In season one, he is an insurance salesman who also runs a group therapy of which Frank only visits from outside. Curtis is well aware of Frank's activities as the Punisher and even admits that he would have helped hunt the people that killed the Castle family. He is also a former US Navy Special Amphibious Reconnaissance Corpsman. Curtis is later visited by David Lieberman to assist Frank after he sustained serious injuries during a fight. He attempts to help one of his therapy visitors, Lewis Wilson, but he slowly loses his sanity and beats and ties up Curtis to a bomb. However, Frank manages to rescue him. In season two, Curtis is trying to move on with his life and has started dating a woman named Delia. However, he is dragged back in when confronted by Billy Russo. With no other options, he teams up with Frank and Dinah Madani to locate and kill Billy.

William Rawlins
William Rawlins is a fictional character in the Marvel Comics Universe. He first appeared in The Punisher vol. 4 #14 (Sept. 2002), and was created by writer Garth Ennis and artist Steve Dillon.

A CIA agent who set up a terrorist cell in Riyadh, Saudi Arabia on the orders of a rogue group of US Army and US Air Force generals later used as a distraction while Frank Castle and a Delta Force operator infiltrated a Russian missile silo to retrieve a virus sample. He is also one of Kathryn O'Brien's ex-husbands, and on their honeymoon pushed Kathryn out of a helicopter into the hands of the terrorists to protect a shipment of heroin. Rawlins is later assigned by the generals to organize the death of Castle with Nicky Cavella who he had an intimate relationship with. He is later kidnapped by O'Brien and Castle, where he's tortured by Castle to find out information about the rogue generals, which is taped. During the torture session, Rawlins lost an eye. He later escapes and sells his information of the terrorist attack on Russia to the Russian military, since he has become persona non grata to the CIA and needed protection. He later betrays the Russians for his own ulterior gains. Before he is finally able to escape and disappear, Rawlins is murdered by Castle in the men's restroom of Kabul International Airport.

William J. "Bill" Rawlins III appeared as the main antagonist in season one of The Punisher, portrayed by Paul Schulze. This version has the codename Agent Orange. He and Ray Schoonover oversaw a team of commandos who carried out "Operation Cerberus", illegally sanctioned assassinations of high-profile targets that are bankrolled by illegal heroin trafficking. When the team is caught in an ambush due to Rawlins disregarding warnings that the operation is a trap, Frank Castle furiously punches Rawlins hard enough to cause an orbital blowout fracture, blinding him in his left eye, which is left a permanent milky gray. In the present day, he is made director of the CIA's covert operations unit and has built a network of security via illegal dealings and assassinations. When he and Billy Russo realize that the Punisher survived Schoonover's boat explosion, he attempts numerous times to kill Castle, but fails until Castle allows himself to be caught as part of a plan of his. As retribution for the trouble Frank caused him, Rawlins restrains and tortures Castle, taking so much joy in the endeavor that he refuses to allow Russo to put him out of his misery and instead gives Frank adrenaline to force him to remain alive so that he can remove his eye as a form of ironic revenge. But before he could, Frank eventually gets free and kills him by beating him, stabbing him repeatedly, and then gouging out his eyes.

Mennonite
The Mennonite is a fictional character in the Marvel Comics Universe. He first appeared in Punisher MAX #3 (March 2010), and was created by writer Jason Aaron and artist Steve Dillon.

An unnamed farmer simply known as the Mennonite lived in a community of Amish farmers. His wife Mary was sick, and it did not look like Mary was getting better. Their two sons found a box full of dangerous weapons, and when the Mennonite caught them, he took the box and buried it by a tree in a field. Giving in to his faith, he prayed to God for some way to help his wife, only to get word from his sons that someone named Rigoletto was looking to hire him. Resigned, the Mennonite takes the box of weapons and heads on his way. He enters the city to meet with Rigoletto, whom he refuses to divulge his "Christian name" to, and accepts the job of killing the Punisher though only with the tools that his religion allows. The Mennonite and the Punisher face off with the former using a hammer, horses, and his bare hands to take the latter on in a fight. Tiring out, the Mennonite reaches for one of the Punisher's guns, only to get electrified. The Punisher drops a safe on his head, killing him. Meanwhile, his sons wait with Mary unaware that their father failed them.

Mennonite in other media
A character named John Pilgrim appeared as the main antagonist in season two of The Punisher, played by Josh Stewart. The character is loosely inspired by the Mennonite in that both are men with violent pasts who find religion, only to revert to their previous selves due in some part to The Punisher. Pilgrim was once a former white supremacist named Robert who found himself jailed for his reckless behavior. He was "saved" by company CEOs Anderson Schultz and Eliza Schultz and converted to Christianity, became a pastor, and removed his damning tattoos. He married a woman named Rebecca, with whom he had two sons named Michael and Lemuel. His past comes back to haunt him when the Schultzes hire him to hunt down Amy Bendix, a young girl who stole incriminating photos of their senator son kissing a man. He solemnly is forced to leave his family for the job, as his wife is sick and bedridden, and along with several mercenaries he locates Amy at a small town Sheriff's office where they encounter the Punisher. Pilgrim continues to hunt for Amy and the Punisher, though after a rough encounter with his former Neo-Nazi colleagues, he gets word from Eliza that Rebecca has passed away, leaving him broken. Everything culminates in a one-on-one fight with the Punisher, but when Pilgrim is nearly defeated, he asks the Punisher to spare his children. The Punisher instead kills the Schultzes and rescues the children. After reuniting with his kids, Pilgrim parts ways with the Punisher.

Tombstone

References 

Punisher characters
Lists of supporting characters in comics